The Ternopil Oblast local election, 2009 elections in the Ternopil Oblast regional council, were held on March 15, 2009 on December 18, 2008, by the Ukrainian Parliament initiated by Bloc Yulia Tymoshenko (BYuT) but cancelled on 3 March 2009 by the same Parliament, with most members of BYuT voting against holding the snap elections (allegedly because of the fall of the ratings for BYuT). Following a lawsuit filed by Svoboda the Ternopil oblast` court acknowledged this decision illegal on March 11, 2009. The next day BYuT lodged an appeal in the Lviv Administrative Appeal Court against this decision.

On 13 March 2009, President Viktor Yushchenko asked the Constitutional Court to estimate the constitutionality of the Ukrainian Parliament’s decision to cancel the early regional council elections in Ternopil. According to Yushchenko the Constitution reads that Parliament can appoint elections or early elections into the local authorities, but cannot cancel them. The elections were held on 15 March 2009. The Bloc Yulia Tymoshenko called the election "the presentation of cynical election fraud by [Head of the Presidential Secretariat Viktor] Baloha as an expression of the will of the region's citizens".

Some villages reported cases Party of Regions representatives offering ₴50 per vote.

Challenging the results

On March 24, the Ternopil district administrative court rejected a lawsuit from the Bloc of Yulia Tymoshenko (BYuT) challenging the results of the elections. Four days later the Kyiv district administrative court banned the official publication of the result of the elections.

On April 7 the Lviv administrative court of appeals ruled to cancel a decision of the Ternopil district administrative court denying consideration of a lawsuit from BYuT against the results of the elections to the Ternopil regional council. The Lviv administrative court of appeals instructed the Ternopil district administrative court to consider the essence of the lawsuit.

On May 11, 2009 BYuT members gave up their twelve seats in Ternopil regional council. As a result, the number of deputies in the regional Ternopil council became 208. The overall number of mandates in the council still constitutes 120, and all the decisions taken by the majority of the council still has to be passed by no less than 61 votes.

On June 16, 2009 the Constitutional Court of Ukraine deemed the parliamentary resolution on canceling early election to Ternopil Regional Council (of March 3, 2009) unconstitutional. This case was initiated by President Viktor Yuschenko.

Results 

The election have been conducted after the proportional electoral system. In an order to conduct the representatives in the Ternopil regional council, party or block must collect not less than 3% voices of electors.

According to political annalist the scores of United Centre and Party of Regions could be caused by mass fraud. Experts were less surprised by the high score of All-Ukrainian Union "Freedom" because (according to the think tank "Open Policy") support for rightist parties like "Freedom" typically builds up in conditions of economic and political crisis and "Freedom" has roots in the region. The turnout in Ternopil (city) was only 25%.

Polls

Ternopil city council
The elections to Ternopil city council took place in fall of 2010.

Mayor elections
 Serhiy Nadal (Svoboda) - 27% (25,988 votes)
 Roman Zastavny (For Ukraine!) - 16% (15,709 votes)
 Petro Hoch (Party of Regions) - 13% (12,630 votes)

See also
 2010 Ukrainian local elections
 2008 Kyiv local election

References

External links 
 Official website Ternopil Oblast Council election news
  Ukrainian local elections, 2010 (West)
  Results of the local elections (Ternopil city)

2009 elections in Ukraine
Local elections in Ukraine
March 2009 events in Ukraine
History of Ternopil Oblast